Lady Karma is the third full-length studio album by Israeli punk band Kill the Drive. It was on December 3, 2011, in Israel and later released worldwide on February 9, 2012, after the band was signed to Broken English Records in February 2012, being the band's first album officially available outside of Israel and Japan.

The album is the band's first with lead guitarist Or Yaakov and bassist Jonathan Shkedi, and the first album recorded by the band as a four-piece. The album is also the first the band recorded outside of Israel, opting to record it at Nada Recording Studio in New Windsor, New York in the US, with producer John Naclerio, where previously such bands as Polar Bear Club and The Audition have recorded.

The album is originally titled after a song the band wrote around 2008, though it was only released for free listening on their Myspace page and never included on any album, except as a bonus track on their second album A Postcard from Hell.

On October 30, 2011, the song "Apocalypse 101", was released for free streaming through SoundCloud. On November 11, 2011, the first official single from the album, "Monsters In My Bed", was released along with a music video. On June 18, 2012, "Apocalypse 101" was released as the second official single, with a music video being released through BlankTV, also featuring Ishay Berger of Useless ID.

Track listing

Personnel
Eyal Reiner - lead vocals, rhythm guitar
Or Yaakov - lead guitar, backing vocals
Jonathan Shkedi - bass
Gideon Berger - drums, percussion

References

2011 albums
Kill the Drive albums